Mücka is a railway station in the village of Mücka, Saxony, Germany. The station lies on the Węgliniec–Roßlau railway, train services are operated by Ostdeutsche Eisenbahn.

Train services
The station is served by the following services:

regional service  Hoyerswerda - Görlitz

References

External links
 
Deutsche Bahn website
Ostdeutsche Eisenbahn website

Railway stations in Saxony